The Battle of Ebrahimkhel was a pursuit action between the Allied forces and the Taliban forces during the War on Terror. In the end, the Battle at Ebrahimkhel was the largest ground-to-ground firefight since the Vietnam War in 1968.

Battle 
The first actions were when the Talibans raided the community of Qalat. Attacks went on for the nights before August 8, 2006, and the Afghans there lost a rate of three officers a week. On hit-and-run missions, the Afghan police checkpoint was battered from RPG and mortar rounds. The Afghans and Americans decided to chase down the Taliban and kill or capture them. The Afghans and Americans set off on a chase after the dozen Taliban insurgents who attacked the checkpoint. The convoy was to meet up with Romanian soldiers who had the communications and a powerful machine gun. However, they misunderstood and returned to their base. As the unit neared the first village, a Taliban fired a few potshots at the lead truck, but was captured. He was part of a Taliban ploy where they gave him a weapon and if he didn't shoot the Allies, they would kill him. Later, an old man told the Allies that the Taliban passed through, and the Americans began to chase them to the border with Pakistan. Then, the Allied radio (Icom) informed them that the Al-Qaeda had joined the Talibans. When both were together, they had the tendency to fight to the last man.

The Allies were stranded due to no or little communications. Since the road to Qalat was a four-mile walk in the darkness of night, the team stopped at the town of Ebrahimkhel. The insurgent convoy turned to attack them. As the insurgents fired RPGs, the Allies drove their car into the cul-de-sac of the village. The insurgent RPGs hit the area around the Americans, and they responded with more fire. The assault leader was killed by the Americans. Though the Afghans had two to three times more men than the Allies, the Allies troops fought hard still. The Americans used their LAW weapon, the cousin of the more modern AT4. One of its missiles tore through a wall, followed by three others that imploded the insurgent weapons cache. IEDs damaged the Allied lead truck late in the battle, but the explosion's embankment soon smoothened. The allies fought their way to the enemy convoy, destroying it. The Allies prepared to finish off the insurgents, the Americans assaulting the enemy at the right at a swamp, attacking and killing 12. Later, the Americans received word that two Dutch F-16s were taking off from Bagram Airfield, 20 or 30 minutes away. The fight had reached its two-hour mark when the F-16s arrived, and the Americans smoked the position where the enemy was to locate where they needed fire. The Dutch dropped flares on the enemy, trying make them flee. Then, the Americans took up positions on a hill which was raked by RPG fire. The Allies evacuated the area down Route 1 to Qalat for safety. The battle was the biggest since the Vietnam War. It was confirmed by the military that the Americans and their 35 Afghan comrades had faced a force of an estimated 300 Taliban and Al-Qaeda fighters, of which at least 25 were killed.

References 

Conflicts in 2008
Battles of the War in Afghanistan (2001–2021)
Military operations of the War in Afghanistan (2001–2021) involving the United States
2008 in Afghanistan
History of Zabul Province
August 2008 events in Asia
Battles of the War in Afghanistan (2001–2021) involving the Netherlands